Tim Lutkin is a British lighting designer for theatre and live events.

Life and career
Tim was born in Beverley, England. He moved to London in 2005. He graduated from the Guildhall School of Music & Drama. He has designed for production companies such as, The National Theatre, The Walt Disney Company, The Royal Shakespeare Company, Chichester Festival Theatre, The Almeida and Menier Chocolate Factory.

Selected productions

Life of PI (Wyndhams Theatre)
Back to the Future: The Musical (Adelphi Theatre)
Fiddler on the Roof (Playhouse Theatre)
Big (musical) (Dominion Theatre and National Tour)

Noises Off (Garrick Theatre)
Chimerica (Harold Pinter Theatre and Almeida Theatre)
Strangers on a Train (Gielgud Theatre)

Awards and nominations 

|-
|rowspan="3"| 2022
|rowspan="2"| Back to the Future: The Musical
| WhatsOnStage Awards for Best Lighting Design
| 
| 
|-
| Laurence Olivier Award for Best Lighting Design
| 
|rowspan="2"| 
|-
|rowspan="2"| Life of Pi
| Laurence Olivier Award for Best Lighting Design
| 
|-
| 2021
| BroadwayWorld Awards for Best Lighting Design
| 
| 
|-
| 2020
| Present Laughter
| WhatsOnStage Awards for Best Lighting Design
| 
| 
|-
| 2019
| Life of Pi
|UK Theatre Awards for Best Design
| 
| 
|-
| 2016
| The Life of the Party
| Theater Bay Area award for Outstanding Lighting Design
| 
| 
|-
|rowspan="3"| 2014
| Chimerica
| Laurence Olivier Award for Best Lighting Design
| 
| 
|-
| Strangers on a Train
| WhatsOnStage Awards for Best Lighting Design
| 
| 
|-
|-
| The Crucible
| Knight Of Illumination award for Best Lighting Design
| 
| 
|-
|}

References

External links
 

  

Lighting designers
Laurence Olivier Award winners
Year of birth missing (living people)
Living people